Abdul Ahad Momand (born 1959) is an Afghan-German and former Afghan Air Force aviator who became the first, and currently only, Afghan citizen to journey to outer space.

He became one of Soyuz TM-6 crew members and spent nine days aboard the Mir space station in 1988 as an Intercosmos Research Cosmonaut. He holds many records as an Afghan Astronaut. During this mission, Abdul Ahad Momand was the first cosmonaut to speak the Pashto language after he made a telephone call to Afghanistan, making it the fifth language to be officially spoken in space. He became the first Afghan citizen and the  fourth Muslim to visit outer space, after Sultan bin Salman Al Saud, Muhammed Faris, and Musa Manarov.

Biography 
Momand was born sometime in 1959 in Sardeh Band, Andar District, within the Ghazni Province of Afghanistan. He belongs to the Momand tribe of the Pashtun ethnic group. After completing his initial schooling, he entered the Kabul Polytechnic University in 1976 at the age of 17, and graduated a year later before being drafted into the military in 1978. He was then sent to the Soviet Union for pilot training. There, he studied at the Krasnodar Higher Air Force School and the Kiev Higher Air Force Engineering School before returning to Afghanistan in 1981, where he rose through the ranks, becoming a chief navigator. He returned to the USSR in 1984 to train at the Gagarin Air Force Academy. Not long after graduating in 1987, he was selected as a cosmonaut candidate for the Intercosmos project. The other cosmonaut candidate sent for training was Mohammad Dawran, a Tajik MiG-21 pilot with the rank of Colonel. While Dawran had more political connections than Momand and held a higher military rank (since Momand was a captain at the time), Dawran's appendicitis was the deciding factor in Momand being chosen for the primary crew. Dawran then became part of the backup crew for Momand's mission.

Along with Commander Vladimir Lyakhov and Flight Engineer Valery Polyakov, Momand was part of the Soyuz TM-6 three-man crew, which launched at 04:23 GMT 29 August 1988. Momand's inclusion in the mission was a significant symbol during the Soviet–Afghan War.

During his nine days stay on the Mir space station, Momand took photographs of his country, participated in astrophysical, medical and biological experiments. He also spoke to President Mohammed Najibullah, and brewed Afghan tea for the crew. Momand was also recorded reciting the Quran in space at the request of the Afghan Government while his legs were held by another crew member outside of the shot to prevent him from floating away. 

Lyakhov and Momand returned to Earth aboard Soyuz TM-5. The September 6 planned landing of Soyuz TM-5 was delayed because of mechanical complications on the Mir. Radio Moscow reassured listeners that Lyakhov and Momand were fine and in touch with Mission Control. However, their sanitation facilities were on board the jettisoned orbital module and consequently they soiled themselves during the delay. A recording, colloquially called the der’mo tape, was played of them laughing about this. A day later, the retro-fire was successful, and at 00:50 GMT Soyuz TM-5 landed near Dzhezkazgan. During touchdown, there was no live radio coverage, but only live television pictures of Mission Control.

Momand was awarded the title of Hero of the Soviet Union on 7 September 1988.

During his flight to space, his mother was extremely distraught over the safety of her son. President Najibullah called Momand's mother into the President's office and arranged an audio/video conference between Momand and her. By this event, Pashto became the fifth language spoken in space.

On his return, he was made deputy minister of civil aviation, but the posting lasted for six months due to the failure of Soviet forces against the Mujahideen's takeover. At the time, he had been on business trip to India, and he did not return to Afghanistan.

Following the collapse of Najibullah's government in 1992, Momand decided to emigrate to Germany, and applied for asylum there, becoming a German citizen via naturalisation in 2003. He worked in the printing service and is now an accountant residing in Ostfildern near Stuttgart. He returned to Afghanistan in 2013, at the request of former president Hamid Karzai, for the occasion of the twenty-fifth anniversary of his space mission.

See also 
 Timeline of astronauts by nationality
 List of Muslim astronauts

Footnotes

References

Bibliography

External links
 Article of Dr. Yasin Iqbal Yousafzai- Abdul Ahad Mohmand 
 Biographies of International Astronauts – Abdul Ahad Mohmand
 First Afghan in Space – Abdul Ahad Momand
 Abdul Ahad Mohmand – The First Afghan in Space (29 August to 6 September 1988)
 Abdul Ahad Mohmand The first and Only Afghan Who went to space
 Nils Fischer “Islamic religious practice in outer space.” ISIM review (2008) 22: 39.

Afghan cosmonauts
Afghan emigrants to Germany
Recipients of the Order of Lenin
Foreign Heroes of the Soviet Union
Naturalized citizens of Germany
Pashtun people
1959 births
Living people
Afghan military personnel
Afghan government officials
Military Academy of the General Staff of the Armed Forces of the Soviet Union alumni
People from Ghazni Province
Mir crew members